Bens Branch is a stream in Jasper County in the U.S. state of Missouri.

The identity of the namesake of Bens Branch has been lost.

See also
List of rivers of Missouri

References

Rivers of Jasper County, Missouri
Rivers of Missouri